Washington County uses the standard blue pentagon to sign County State-Aid Highways (CSAH) and the white square to sign County Roads (CR).

CR 1–CR 20

County Road 2 

County Road 2 is a county route in Forest Lake, Minnesota. It follows Broadway Avenue in Forest Lake from a roundabout at US Highway 61 to Interstate 35 just north of the split between I-35W and I-35E. County Road 2 then continues westward to the edge of the county where it becomes Anoka County Road 18. County Road 2 used to continue north on US Highway 61 and then follow North Shore Trail until it ended at Scandia Trail (MN 97) in eastern Forest Lake.

County Road 3
County Road 3 is a county route that serves Scandia and May Township. County Road 3 begins at Square Lake Trail (County Road 7) and continues north to 170th Street North (Washington County 4) in northern May Township. County Road 3 continues at 170th Street North (Washington County 4) in northern May Township as Olinda Trail North into Scandia where it intersects both County Road 52 and Scandia Trail (MN 97). Olinda Trail continues out of the county as Chisago County 25 as it heads towards the Chisago Lakes area. County Road 3 was extended south from its former southern terminus at 170th Street North south to Square Lake Trail. This section of road was originally signed as County Road 55.

County Road 4

County Road 4 is a county route which connects Hugo on the western side of Washington County, to Marine on St. Croix on the eastern edge of the county. County Road 4 follows 170th Street from its beginning at US Highway 61 until after its intersection with Olinda Trail in May Township. County Road 4 turns onto Broadway Street in Marine on St. Croix and then terminates almost immediately at St. Croix Trail (MN 95).

County Road 4A

County Road 4A is a short county route in the city of Hugo in Washington County. County Road 4A also follows 170th Street west to the edge of the county where it becomes Anoka County Road 140.

County Road 5
County Road 5 is a county route in Washington County that connects Stillwater and May Township. In Stillwater, County Road 5 is known as Stillwater Boulevard before continuing onto Olive Street and then turning onto Owens Street. County Road 5 continues through a busy intersection with County Road 12 as Owens Street. County Road 5 then becomes Stonebridge Trail as it approaches Dellwood Road (MN 96). County Road 5 continues past Minnesota Highway 96 before terminating at Otchipwe Avenue (Washington County 11).

County Road 6
County Road 6 is a county route in the cities of Lake Elmo and Oakdale in Washington County. County Road 6 begins at an intersection on the county line between Minnesota Highway 120 and Minnesota Highway 5. County Road 6 heads eastward as Stillwater Boulevard towards its eastern terminus. County Road 6 has a concurrency with County Road 13  along its short route. County Road 6 terminates at a roundabout with Jamaca Avenue and 34th Street (Washington County 14).

County Road 7
County Road 7 is a county route that serves the towns of Hugo, Grant, and Marine on St. Croix. County Road 7's western conterminous is at the county line, where it begins going east as 117th Street North before becoming 122nd St N. County Road 7 has a short concurrency with Manning Avenue (Washington County 15) before turning onto Square Lake Trail. 7 becomes Paul Avenue and then Nason Hill Road before reaching Marine on St. Croix, where it ends at St. Croix Trail (MN 95).

County Road 8
County Road 8 is a county route that serves the town of Hugo in northern Washington County. 8 begins at the county line and after a short distance as Frenchman Road, has a concurrency with US Highway 61. County Road 8 then turns on Egg Lake Road and changes street names many times before terminating at County Road 7 .

County Road 9
County Road 9 is a county route in Washington County that serves the city of Grant. County Road 9 begins at 75th Street (Washington County 12) in southern Grant. 9 continues north as Jamaca Avenue County Road 9 terminates at County Road 7  in southern Hugo.

County Road 10
County Road 10 is known as 10th Street North for all of its route. County Road 10 serves the cities of Oakdale and Lake Elmo. 10 begins at the county line and goes east. County Road 10 has an interchange with Interstate 694 and is Exit 57 from the interstate. 10 continues east and has major intersections at both Inwood Avenue (Washington County 13) and Manning Avenue (Washington County 15). County Road 10 ends at Stagecoach Trail (Washington County 21) in West Lakeland Township.

County Road 11
County Road 11 is a county route that serves Stillwater and May Township. County Road 11 begins at Minnesota Highway 96 just west of its terminus at Minnesota 95. County Road 11 is known as Boom Road before it goes around a sharp turn and changes names to Otchipwe Trail. County Road 11 ends at Square Lake Trail (Washington County 7) in May Township.

County Road 12
County Road 12 is a county route that serves Mahtomedi, Willernie, Grant, and Stillwater in Washington County. Originally, County Road 12 began as Stillwater Road in Mahtomedi after an intersection with Wildwood Road (MN 244). After Highway 244 was decommissioned, 12 was extended east to begin at State Highway 120 on the county line. 12 then continues through Grant as 75th Street, and has a major intersection with Manning Avenue (Washington County 15) on the border with Stillwater. County Road 12 then changes names again to Myrtle Street before terminating at County Road 5 (Owens Street).

County Road 13
County Road 13 is a county route in Washington County that serves Oakdale, Lake Elmo, Woodbury, and Cottage Grove. County Road 13 begins at Highway 36 just west of Interstate 694 in Oakdale as Hadley Avenue North. CSAH 13 soon becomes 50th Street North before turning onto Olson Lake Trail. The segments of County Road 13 that follow Hadley Avenue and 50th Street were, until 2019, signed as CSAH 35. 13 then becomes Ideal Avenue and has a major intersection with 34th Street (County Road 14, Old Highway 5). County Road 13 then has a short concurrency with County Road 6 (Stillwater Boulevard) before turning onto Inwood Avenue It has major intersections at 10th Street (Washington County 10) and Interstate 94 (Exit 250) during this stretch before becoming Radio Drive. 13 continues through Woodbury with a major intersection at Valley Creek Road (Washington County 16) before entering Cottage Grove. In Cottage Grove, County Road 13, now Hinton Avenue, terminates at 70th Street South (Washington County 22).

County Road 14
County Road 14 serves the cities of Oakdale, Lake Elmo, and Bayport. 14 begins its route at Century Avenue (MN 120), the western boundary of the county. County Road 14 continues east on the former route of Minnesota Highway 5 as 34th Street, where it has major intersections at Interstate 694 and Ideal Avenue (Washington County 13). County Road 14 then enters a roundabout at Jamaca Avenue and Stillwater Boulevard (Washington County 6). County Road 14 adopts the name Stillwater Boulevard and continues through downtown Lake Elmo, before turning onto Manning Ave, where it has a very brief concurrency with County Road 15. County Road 14 turns onto 40th Street North. 14 becomes Olinda Boulevard at its intersection with Oakgreen Avenue (Washington County 65). County Road 14 becomes Osgood Avenue for a short period before turning onto 47th Street County Road 14 has a concurrency with County Road 21 (Stagecoach Trail) before turning yet again onto 50th Street North. County Road 14 continues into Bayport as 5th Avenue before it ends at 3rd Street (MN 95).

County Road 15
County Road 15 is a county route that serves the cities of Lake Elmo, Oak Park Heights, and Scandia as well as May, Baytown, and West Lakeland Townships. County Road 15 begins at an interchange with Interstate 94 and Minnesota Highway 95 South. County Road 15 goes north as Manning Avenue, and has a major intersection at 10th Street North (Washington County 10). 15 has a very short concurrency with County Road 14 before turning onto Stillwater Boulevard. County Road 15 comes to an interchange with Minnesota Highway 36 and Washington County 5, where it turns and has an unsigned concurrency with Highway 36. County Road 15 then turns onto Manning Avenue and has major intersections at 75th Street North (Washington County 12) and Dellwood Road (MN 96). 15 continues onto Manning Trail, has a major intersection with Minnesota 97, and continues out of the county to the north. County Road 15 is the longest county road in Washington County at 26 miles in length.

County Road 16
County Road 16 is known as Valley Creek Road and serves Woodbury for its entire route. County Road 16 begins at the western county line at Washington County 25 and Ramsey County 72. 16 continues east and has an interchange with Interstate 494 (Exit 59). County Road 16 has major intersections with Radio Drive (Washington County 13) and Woodbury Drive (Washington County 19), before ending at MN 95 on the Woodbury/Afton border. The County Road 16 designation previously ended at County Road 19, but in 2020 it was extended to MN 95.

County Road 17
County Road 17 is a county route that serves the cities of Grant and Lake Elmo. County Road 17 begins at 75th Street (Washington County 12) in Grant and goes south through a major intersection with Minnesota Highway 36. County Road 17 then continues through downtown Lake Elmo, where it has a concurrency with Washington County 14 (Stillwater Boulevard, Old Highway 5). County Road 17 continues south along Lake Elmo Avenue until it ends at 10th Street (Washington County 10).

County Road 17B
County Road 17B is a short county route in the southern portions of Lake Elmo. 17B runs from the intersection between Lake Elmo Avenue (Washington County 17/17B) and 10th Street (Washington County 10). County Road 17B ends at the border with Woodbury above Interstate 94, where there is no interchange.

County Road 18
County Road 18 is a county route that serves the cities of Newport, Woodbury, Afton, St. Mary's Point, Lake St. Croix Beach, Lakeland Shores, and Lakeland. County Road 18 begins at an interchange with Maxwell Avenue (County Road 38) and US Highways 10 and 61 in Newport as Bailey Road. County Road 18 goes east and has a partial interchange with Interstate 494, providing access to US Highways 10 and 61. 18 goes through Woodbury where it has major intersections with Radio Drive (Washington County 13), Woodbury Drive (Washington County 19), and Manning Avenue (MN 95) before becoming 40th Street South. County Road 18 becomes Afton Boulevard and then enters downtown Afton, where it has a short concurrency with Washington County 21 (St. Croix Trail). County Road 18 takes on the name of St. Croix Trail for the rest of its route through St. Mary's Point and Lake St. Croix Beach, goes around three roundabouts while serving the small towns of Lakeland and Lakeland Shores, and ends at the interchange between Interstate 94 and St. Croix Trail (MN 95 North, Washington County 18 South, Exit 258).

County Road 19
County Road 19 is a county route in Washington County that serves the cities of Lake Elmo, Woodbury, and Cottage Grove. County Road 19 begins at the entrance to Lake Elmo Park Reserve and is named Keats Avenue. 19 has a major intersection at 10th Street (Washington County 10) and then at Interstate 94 before entering Woodbury and taking on the name Woodbury Drive. In Woodbury, County Road 19 has major intersections at Valley Creek Road (Washington County 16) and Bailey Road (Washington County 18), where there is a roundabout, before entering Cottage Grove and readopting the name Keats Avenue. 19 has a roundabout at 70th Street South (Washington County 22). For the last 0.3 miles of its route, County Road 19 is known as Innovation Road. County 19 ends at US Highways 10 and 61 in southern Cottage Grove.

County Road 19A
County Road 19A is a short extension of County Road 19 in southern Cottage Grove. It is known as Innovation Road for its entire route from US Highways 10 and 61 to Miller Road.

County Road 20
County Road 20 is a county route that serves the cities of Newport, Woodbury, and Cottage Grove. County Road 20 begins at Bailey Road (Washington County 18) in Newport as Military Road. County Road 20 cuts through southwestern Woodbury where it has a major intersection with Radio Drive (Washington County 13). At Jamaica Avenue, on the border between Cottage Grove and Woodbury, 20 enters into Cottage Grove by turning south on Jamaica. It then ends at County Road 22 (70th Street). Previously, it ended at Keats Avenue (Washington County 19) in Cottage Grove, but was demolished in 2018 to make way for Ravine Parkway, a new east–west road in Cottage Grove. Additionally, County Road 20 used to continue east on what is now Washington County 22 to Afton State Park on the eastern edge of the county. This portion of highway is now marked as County Road 22 as well as Old 20.

CR 21–CR 40

County Road 21
County Road 21 is a county route in Washington County that serves the cities of Oak Park Heights, Bayport, and Afton, as well as Baytown, West Lakeland, and Denmark Townships. County Road 21 begins at MN 95 in Bayport as 56th Street North. Part of this section of County Road 21 was formerly County Road 28. Just after this turn, County Road 21 turns again onto Stagecoach Trail at an intersection that ends Washington County 23. County Road 21 has a short concurrency with Washington County 14 in Bayport before continuing towards Afton. At Interstate 94, County Road 21 does not have an interchange. In downtown Afton, County Road 21 turns onto St. Croix Trail (Washington County 18). County Road 21 then adopts the name St. Croix Trail for itself, which it remains until it ends at US Highway 10 in southern Denmark Township, just west of Prescott, Wisconsin.

County Road 22
County Road 22 is a county route that serves the cities of St. Paul Park and Cottage Grove, as well as Denmark Township. County Road 22 begins in St. Paul Park at an intersection with Broadway Avenue. The road briefly carries the name Summit Avenue before becoming 70th Street South after passing US Highways 61 and 10. It goes east through Cottage Grove where it has major intersections at Hinton Avenue (Washington County 13), Jamaica Avenue, and Keats Avenue (Washington County 19), where there is a roundabout. East of Keats Avenue, County Road 22 is also signed as Old 20. County Road 22 has a major intersection at Manning Avenue (MN 95) and goes through Denmark Township, crossing St. Croix Trail (Washington County 21) and ending at the entrance to Afton State Park.

County Road 23
County Road 23 is a county route that serves the cities of Stillwater and Oak Park Heights. County Road 23 begins as Stagecoach Trail at County Road 21 in Oak Park Heights. 23 turns into 59th Street before turning onto Beach Road at its intersection with 60th Street (Washington County 26). County 23 then continues onto Paris Avenue before turning onto Orleans Street in Stillwater. County Road 23 turns again onto Third Street South and then onto Chestnut Street East as it enters downtown Stillwater, where it ends at Main Street (MN 95).

County Road 24
County Road 24 serves the cities of Stillwater and Oak Park Heights, as well as Baytown Township. County Road 24 begins at 47th Street North (Washington County 14) in Baytown Township, near the unincorporated town of Siegel.  County Road 24 is known as Osgood Avenue and has a major intersection at Minnesota 36 in Oak Park Heights, before entering Stillwater. County Road 24 turns onto Orleans Street in Stillwater, but after only one block, 24 ends at County Road 23.

County Road 25
County Road 25 runs along the western boundary of Washington County as Century Avenue. County Road 25 begins at the interchange between Interstate 94 and Minnesota 120 near the town of Landfall. County Road 25 runs south before ending at an intersection between Century Avenue and Lake Road. County Road 25 is concurrent with Ramsey County 72 for its entire route.

County Road 26
County Road 26 is a county route that serves the city of Oak Park Heights. 26 begins at Osgood Avenue (Washington County 24) just south of an intersection with Minnesota 36. County Road 26 goes east for about half a mile before ending at Beach Road (Washington County 23).

County Road 27
County Road 27 is a county route that serves Mahtomedi, White Bear Lake, and Birchwood Village in Washington County. County Road 27 forms part of the western border of the county. County Road 27 begins at an intersection between Minnesota 120, Minnesota 244, and Ramsey County 15. County Road 27 goes north until in crosses the border into Ramsey County, just south of White Bear Lake. County Road 27 is named East County Line Road for its entire route. County Road 27 is signed with a white square rather than the standard pentagon shown on the map of Washington County.

County Road 28
County Road 28 is a county route that serves Denmark Township. County Road 28 begins at Manning Avenue South (MN 95) and heads east to St. Croix Trail South (Washington County 21). County Road 28 is known as 110th Street South for its entire route. Prior to 2021 County Road 28 was signed as County Road 78.

County Road 29
County Road 29 is a county route that was formerly numbered as County Road 36. County Road 29 begins at an interchange with Minnesota 36. 29 goes north into Mahtomedi before ending at Stillwater Road (Washington County 12). County Road 29 is known as Hilton Trail for its entire route, and serves the towns of Pine Springs, Mahtomedi, and Willernie.

County Road 32
County Road 32 is a county route that serves the city of Forest Lake, Minnesota. County Road 32 was first numbered as County Road 83. County Road 32 begins as 11th Avenue Southwest at Everton Avenue North (Washington County 33). County Road 32 ends at an intersection with US 61 in Forest Lake.

County Road 33
County Road 33 is a county route that serves Forest Lake. It begins at an intersection with 11th Avenue Southwest (Washington County 32) and continues north for a short ways to its northern terminus at Broadway Avenue (Washington County 2).

County Road 38
County Road 38 is a county route that serves the cities of St. Paul Park and Newport. County Road 38 begins at 70th Street South (Washington County 22) in northern St. Paul Park. County Road 38 goes north as Hastings Avenue as it enters Newport. At Glen Road 38 crosses over US Highways 10 and 61 to 7th Avenue. From here County 38 follows 7th Avenue to 21st Street, and then Maxwell Avenue. County Road 38 has a partial interchange with Interstate 494 before it ends at an interchange with US Highways 10 and 61. From this interchange the roadway continues as Bailey Road (Washington County 18).

County Road 39
County Road 39 is a county route that serves the cities of St. Paul Park and Cottage Grove. County Road 39 begins at an intersection with at Summit Avenue (Washington County 22) and Broadway Avenues in St. Paul Park. 39 follows Broadway Avenue going east briefly before turning south onto Hastings Avenue. County Road 39 enters Cottage Grove, following Hadley Avenue to 80th Street South. It then turns east onto 80th Street South to end at an interchange with US Highways 10 and 61.

CR 50–CR 100

County Road 50
County Road 50 is a county route that serves the cities of Forest Lake and Scandia in Washington County, Minnesota. County Road 50 begins at an intersection with US Highway 61 in Forest Lake. 50 continues east as 202nd Street North before making a sharp curve onto Greystone Avenue North, and then another sharp curve onto 200th Street North. County Road 50 continues for less than a mile before making a sharp curve onto Ingersoll Avenue North and then turning right onto 202nd Street North. County Road 50 continues onto Keystone Avenue North and then turns left onto 192nd Street North before ending at Manning Trail North (Washington County 15) in Scandia.

County Road 51
County Road 51 is a county route that serves May Township and Stillwater Township. County Road 51 begins at County Road 7 and goes south as Partridge Road to its southern terminus at St. Croix Trail (MN 95).

County Road 52
County Road 52 is a short county route that serves the city of Scandia. County Road 52 begins at Scandia Trail (MN 97) in central Scandia. 52 heads east as Oakhill Road North and has an intersection with Olinda Trail North (Washington County 3) shortly after beginning. County Road 52 ends at Highway 95 in southeastern Scandia.

County Road 55
County Road 55 is a county route that serves Stillwater Township and May Township. It begins just south of Dellwood Road (Highway 96) at County Road 5. County Road 55 goes north as Norell Avenue North to Square Lake Trail North (County Road 7). Until 2018, County Road 55 continued north through May Township to 170th Street North, but this segment was redesignated as an extension of County State Aid Highway 3.

County Road 57
County Road 57 is a county route that serves the city of Hugo. County Road 57 begins at 170th Street North (Washington County 4) in northern Hugo. 57 goes south as Jeffrey Avenue and then turns onto 152nd Street North. County Road 57 continues onto Keystone Avenue and then Keller Avenue before ending at 122nd Street North (Washington County 7) in southern Hugo.

County Road 59
County Road 59 is a county route that serves May Township. County Road 59 begins at Paul Avenue (Washington County 7) and goes east as Square Lake Trail to its eastern terminus at St. Croix Trail (MN 95). County Road 59 is signed as a county state aid highway rather than a county road, which it is signed as on the county map.

County Road 61
County Road 61 is a county route that serves Grant, May Township, and Stillwater Township. 61 begins at an intersection with Manning Trail North (Washington County 15) as 120th Street. County Road 61 goes east and turns south onto Myeron Road. County Road 61 ends at Norell Avenue (Washington County 55) in Stillwater Township.

County Road 62
County Road 62 is a short county route that serves Stillwater and Oak Park Heights. County Road 62 begins at Osgood Avenue North (Washington County 24) just north of Highway 36 in Stillwater. County Road 62 goes east and ends at Panama Avenue in Stillwater. 62 helps provide access to the Washington County Government Center.

County Road 63
County Road 63 is a short county route that serves the city of Stillwater. County Road 63 goes south from its northern terminus at 62nd Street (Washington County 62) to 60th Street North. County Road 63 provides access to the Washington County Government Center.

County Road 64
County Road 64 is a county route that serves the city of Stillwater. County Road 64 begins at Manning Avenue North (Washington County 15) and heads east as McKusick Road into Stillwater. County road 64 ends at an intersection with Owens Street North (Washington County 5) in northern Stillwater.

County Road 65
County Road 65 is a county route that serves Baytown and West Lakeland Townships. County Road 65 begins at 40th Street North (Washington County 14) and heads southward to where it ends at 10th Street North (Washington County 10).

County Road 66
County Road 66 is a short county route that serves only the city of Stillwater. County Road 66 begins at Highway 36 and goes north as Greeley Street. 66 has a stoplight at Curve Crest Boulevard just before ending at Orleans Street West.

County Road 71
County Road 71 is a county route that serves Afton, Baytown Township, and Denmark Township. County Road 71 begins at 10th Street North (Washington County 10) and heads southward. County Road 71 crosses but has no access to Interstate 94. 71 goes all the way through Afton and ends at 70th Street South (Washington County 22) in northern Denmark Township. County Road 71 is known as Neal Avenue for its whole route.

County Road 74
County Road 74 is a county route that serves the cities of Newport and Cottage Grove. County Road 74 begins in Newport at Hastings Avenue South (Washington County 38) and heads east as 65th Street South. County Road 74 enters into Cottage Grove and ends at Hinton Avenue South (Washington County 13).

County Road 75
County Road 75 is a county route that serves St. Paul Park and Grey Cloud Island Township. County Road 75 begins at 14th Avenue in St. Paul Park. 75 heads south as Grey Cloud Island Drive into Grey Cloud Island Township, where it ends at 105th Street South.

County Road 76
County Road 76 is a county route that serves Denmark Township. It begins at the western edge of the township at Highway 95 and heads across Denmark Township to St. Croix Trail (Washington County 21). County Road 76 is known as 90th Street South for its entire route.

County Road 91
County Road 91 is a county route that used to be designated as County Road 1. The route is still co-signed as Old 1. County Road 91 begins at Scandia Trail (MN 97) and heads north to the Chisago County Line as Lofton Avenue North.

Route list

References

 
 
 

Washington
Transportation in Washington County, Minnesota
Washington